A number of armed groups have involved themselves in the ongoing Yemeni civil war.

Yemeni civil war (2014–present)

See also
List of armed groups in the Syrian Civil War spillover in Lebanon
List of armed groups in the Syrian Civil War
List of armed groups in the Iraqi Civil War
List of armed groups in the Libyan Civil War
Combatants of the Iraq War

References

Civil War, armed groups
Civil War, armed groups
Armed groups
Armed groups
Lists of armed groups